Sture Landqvist (15 January 1925 – 2 February 2016) was a Swedish middle-distance runner who competed in the 1952 Summer Olympics. He was born in Gothenburg.

References

1925 births
2016 deaths
Swedish male middle-distance runners
Olympic athletes of Sweden
Athletes (track and field) at the 1952 Summer Olympics
Athletes from Gothenburg